The Royal Numismatic Society of Belgium, known in Dutch as the Koninklijk Belgisch Genootschap voor Numismatiek and in French as the Société Royale de Numismatique de Belgique, is a society focusing on the field of numismatics.

About the Society 
The Society was founded on 28 November 1841. It celebrated its 150th anniversary in 1991, when a history of the society was written. It is a non-profit organization under the High Protection of the King of the Belgians.

Publications 
The Society publishes the journal Revue Belge de Numismatique et de Sigillographie and an annual bibliography of numismatics (since 1988).

Prizes 
The Society awards two prizes: Prix de la Société Royale de Numismatique de Belgique and the Prix Hubertus Goltzius.

Prix de la Société Royale de Numismatique de Belgique 

Awarded every four years. Inaugurated in 1976, and first awarded in 1981.
 2014 Lyce Jankowski - on Chinese numismatics
 2001 Christophe Flament
 1998 François de Callataÿ
 1981 M.-Th. Rath - on the medals of Charles VI

Prix Hubertus Goltzius 
Awarded every three years. To be awarded for the first time in 2019.

References 
 The website of the Royal Numismatic Society of Belgium

Notes 

Belgian awards
Awards for numismatics
Numismatic associations